was a Japanese rower. He competed in the men's eight event at the 1932 Summer Olympics.

References

1909 births
2001 deaths
Japanese male rowers
Olympic rowers of Japan
Rowers at the 1932 Summer Olympics
Sportspeople from Spokane, Washington